Circle Takes the Square is an American screamo band from Savannah, Georgia. It is composed of founding members Drew Speziale and Kathleen Stubelek, as well as Caleb Collins. Their debut release was a 6-track self-titled EP released in 2001, followed by a 7" split with Pg. 99 in 2002. In 2004, they released their debut studio album As the Roots Undo on Robotic Empire, which released the CD, and HyperRealist Records, which released the gatefold LP. The album gained them considerable acclaim and the band toured extensively to promote it during the year. This included a six-week east coast tour that took the band into Canada for the first time, supported by Arkata and Raise Them And Eat Them. The band's sophomore album, Decompositions: Volume Number One, was released after an 8-year silence on December 21, 2012, as a digital download; physical editions of the album were released in April 2013.

Musical style

Ben Sailer of Noisey wrote that As the Roots Undo, which Drew Speziale "describes as 'just a punk rock record from 2004', has long garnered praise from both the press and fans alike for its forward-thinking blend of 90s screamo, fractured grindcore, and experimental post-rock". According to Metal Injection, Circle Takes the Square have "made a legendary name for themselves ... with their blend of progressive experimentation and DIY hardcore, metal, and noise ... characterized by a natural fusion of the off-the-wall structures of grindcore and the sweeping guitar dynamics of post-punk". They have described themselves as "...a punk rock band with reverence for the Mystery." Writing for NPR music, Lars Gotrich credited Circle Takes the Square alongside Pg. 99, Orchid and Majority Rule as pioneers of emotional post-hardcore.

Members 
Current
 Drew Speziale – guitars, strings, piano, keyboard, vocals (1999–present)
 Kathleen Coppola Stubelek – bass, vocals (1999–present)
 Caleb Collins – drums, percussion, samples, programming, synthesizers (2007–present)
 Anthony Stubelek - live production (2004–present)

Former
 Robbie Rose – vocals (1999–2000)
 Collin Kelly – guitar (1999–2002)
 Jay Wynne – drums, percussion (1999–2005)
 Bobby Scandiffio – guitar (2004–2006; died 2011)
 Josh Ortega – drums, percussion (2005–2007)
 David Rabitor – guitars, backing vocals (2007–2013)

Timeline

Discography 
Studio albums
As the Roots Undo (2004, Robotic Empire/HyperRealist)
Decompositions: Volume Number One (2012, Gatepost Recordings)

EPs
Circle Takes the Square (2001, self-released/HyperRealist)
Document #13: Pyramids in Cloth (split w/Pg. 99, August 2002, Perpetual Motion Machine)
Decompositions: Volume Number One, Chapter I: Rites of Initiation  (2011, Gatepost Recordings)

 Compilations
 "In the Nervous Light of Sunday" (Alternate version) 10" vinyl only(2004, Monocore Records)
 "Crowquill" — Building Records Presents 60 Songs (November 2003, Building)
 "Non-Objective Portrait of Karma" — Robotic Empire Sampler No. 2 (2004, Robotic Empire)
 "The Conspiracy of Seeds" — 65daysofstatic - The Destruction of Small Ideas (April 2007, Monotreme)

References

External links
 

American screamo musical groups
American emo musical groups
American post-hardcore musical groups
American grindcore musical groups
American experimental rock groups
American post-rock groups
American post-metal musical groups
Punk rock groups from Georgia (U.S. state)
Hardcore punk groups from Georgia (U.S. state)
Heavy metal musical groups from Georgia (U.S. state)
Alternative rock groups from Georgia (U.S. state)
Musical groups from Savannah, Georgia
2000 establishments in Georgia (U.S. state)
Musical groups established in 1999